Shiori Nagata (born 24 October 1987) is a Japanese handball player for Omron and the Japanese national team.

She participated at the 2011 World Women's Handball Championship in Brazil, and at the 2013 World Women's Handball Championship in Serbia.

References

1987 births
Living people
Japanese female handball players
Handball players at the 2014 Asian Games
Handball players at the 2018 Asian Games
Asian Games silver medalists for Japan
Asian Games bronze medalists for Japan
Asian Games medalists in handball
Medalists at the 2014 Asian Games
Medalists at the 2018 Asian Games
Sportspeople from Fukuoka (city)
Handball players at the 2020 Summer Olympics
21st-century Japanese women